Kaki Rural District is in Kaki District of Dashti County, Bushehr province, Iran. At the census of 2006, its population was 2,664 in 530 households; there were 2,644 inhabitants in 680 households at the following census of 2011; and in the most recent census of 2016, the population of the rural district was 2,898 in 821 households. The largest of its 25 villages was Boniad, with 819 people.

References 

Rural Districts of Bushehr Province
Populated places in Dashti County